The 2019–20 season was Mohammedan SC's 12th competitive season.
 The season began on 13 February 2020 and was suspended on 15 March 2020, due to the COVID-19 pandemic in the Bangladesh. On 17 May 2020, the league was declared void by the BFF executive committee.

Current squad
Dhaka Mohammedan squad for 2019–20 season.

Competitions

Federation Cup

Group D

Knockout stage

Premier League

League table

Results summary

Results by round

Matches

Statistics

Goals

References

Mohammedan SC (Dhaka) seasons
Bangladeshi football club records and statistics
2019 in Bangladeshi football
2020 in Bangladeshi football